Vanikoro (sometimes wrongly named Vanikolo) is an island in the Santa Cruz group, located  to the Southeast of the main Santa Cruz group. It is part of the Temotu Province of the Solomon Islands.

The name Vanikoro is always used as though it referred to a single island, due to both its geophysical and cultural unity. However, technically it is a group of several nearby islands surrounded by a single belt of coral reef. Only the two major islands are inhabited: the bigger one Banie, and the smaller one Teanu (or Tevai). Other, uninhabited islets in the Vanikoro group include Manieve, Nomianu and Nanunga.

Population and languages

The  of Vanikoro consist of two different populations, who tend to live separately.

The Melanesian majority, about 800 people, are the descendants of the original population of Vanikoro. As far as we know, they have been present on the island since Lapita times – about 3,200 years ago.

A minority of about 500 individuals are of Polynesian descent: they have migrated from the island of Tikopia, an island lying  eastwards, which they identify as their origin. They established their first settlements on Vanikoro about 400 years ago on the southern coast of Banie. In 1893, many Tikopians returned to Tikopia as a result of the Solomon Islands having been declared a British protectorate.; but several Tikopians returned to Vanikoro in the 1900s. The two major villages are Murivai and Taumako Bay.

The three languages spoken by the Melanesian population of Vanikoro are all Oceanic, of the Temotu subgroup: 
Teanu or Buma (800 speakers)
Lovono or Vano (4 speakers)
Tanema (1 speaker)

The Tikopian settlers speak a Polynesian language, Tikopian or fakatikopia.

History
The first sighting of Vanikoro by Europeans was in September 1595, by the second Spanish expedition of Álvaro de Mendaña. It was sighted by Lorenzo Barreto, while in command of one of the smaller vessels on a voyage around the then Santa Cruz, which is today's Nendo Island.

The French explorer Jean-François de La Pérouse was stranded on Vanikoro after both his vessels, La Boussole and the Astrolabe, struck the then unknown reefs of the island in 1788. It is reported that some of the men were killed by the local inhabitants, while the surviving sailors built a smaller vessel and left the island, but were never seen again. Those that remained on the island died before search parties arrived in 1826. Jules Verne dedicates a chapter of his novel Twenty Thousand Leagues Under the Sea to this event. Author Naomi Williams' novel Landfalls explores the Lapérouse expedition in depth.

Chapter 1, Coral Sea, of James Michener's novel, Tales of the South Pacific, is set on the island of Vanicoro.

Environment
Most of its human population is engaged in subsistence farming. It has been identified by BirdLife International as an Important Bird Area (IBA) because it supports populations of endemic Vanikoro monarchs and Vanikoro white-eyes, as well as of red-bellied fruit doves, pied goshawks, palm lorikeets, cardinal myzomelas, Polynesian trillers and rusty-winged starlings. The Vanikoro flying fox is endemic to the island.

Notes

References
 Vanikoro Island (archived link)
 Resources on the languages of Vanikoro (introduction to the dictionary of Teanu), by linguist A. François.

Islands of the Solomon Islands
Important Bird Areas of the Solomon Islands